James Edward Mann (born April 17, 1959) is a Canadian former professional ice hockey player who played 293 games in the National Hockey League.  He played for the Winnipeg Jets, Quebec Nordiques and the Pittsburgh Penguins. He makes regular appearances with a program for charity, called Oldtimers Hockey Challenge.

Career
Mann was born in Montreal, Quebec. As a youth, he played in the 1972 Quebec International Pee-Wee Hockey Tournament with a minor ice hockey team from Verdun, Quebec.

Career 
Mann was selected by the Winnipeg Jets in the first round of the 1979 NHL Entry Draft, this pick was the first pick in franchise history. Mann made a reputation for himself as a brawler collecting 287 penalty minutes during his first NHL season. 

Mann was suspended for three games and fined $500 for shoving a linesman, Gord Broseker, while trying to resume a fight with defenseman John Gibson in a game against the Toronto Maple Leafs on December 9, 1981. During a game against the Pittsburgh Penguins on January 13, 1982 Penguins center Paul Gardner cross-checked Jets winger Doug Smail in the face, resulting in an injury. Before the next face-off, Mann attacked Gardner from behind with two punches that broke Gardner's jaw. Mann eventually received a ten-game suspension and a criminal record with a $500 fine before the courts of Manitoba. Mann missed the entire 1986–87 season recovering from abdominal injury originally suffered in December 1984.

Career statistics

Awards 
QMJHL First All-Star Team (1979)

Transactions 
February 6, 1984 – Traded to the Quebec Nordiques by the Winnipeg Jets for Quebec's fifth round choice (Brent Severyn) in 1984 NHL Entry Draft.
June 16, 1987 – Signed as a free agent by the Pittsburgh Penguins.

References

External links 
 

1959 births
Living people
Anglophone Quebec people
Canadian ice hockey right wingers
Fredericton Express players
Ice hockey people from Montreal
Indianapolis Ice players
Laval National players
Muskegon Lumberjacks players
National Hockey League first-round draft picks
Pittsburgh Penguins players
Quebec Nordiques players
Sherbrooke Jets players
Tulsa Oilers (1964–1984) players
Winnipeg Jets (1979–1996) draft picks
Winnipeg Jets (1979–1996) players
Canadian expatriate ice hockey players in the United States